Bencini may refer to:

 Bencini (company), a former Italian manufacturer of cameras
 Francis Dominic Bencini (1664–1744), a Maltese philosopher
 Graham Bencini (born 1976), a Maltese professional footballer
 Pietro Paolo Bencini (ca. 1670–1755), an Italian Baroque composer